The Championship of the Ukrainian SSR in football was a top competition of association football in the Ukrainian SSR in 1921-91. Number of Ukrainian clubs almost never competed in the championship such as Dynamo Kyiv.

The competitions were organized by the Football Federation of the Ukrainian SSR that was created in 1959 in place of the Football Section.

Before 1980 selected teams of Moldavian SSR participated in the championship.

Historical outlook
Established as the All-Ukrainian inter-city competition in 1921, later it was included into number of All-Ukrainian Olympiads and Spartakiads. During several seasons the competitions were suspended due to football being identified as a "non-proletariat sport". Also because of a difficult social cataclysm in 1933 (Holodomor), there was no competitions as well.

With the establishment of the All-Union competitions in 1936 (united competitions), the republican football competitions in Ukraine were degraded to regional level. Since then and before the Great Patriotic War, the champion of Ukraine title was awarded to a team that would place first in the First Group (Persha Hrupa) of championship among sports societies and agencies. In 1960 those competitions were suspended and republican title was awarded to the top team of Ukrainian Zone in the Class B (Soviet Second League). The consistent and uniform All-Ukrainian Soviet competition take their beginning from 1960 as the first All-Ukrainian league was formed as part of the Soviet Second League, more known back then as the Klass B, with UkrSSR zone. In 1964 there were also established lower level republican competitions among collectives of physical culture (KFK). In 1970 the Soviet Second League was named as the second group of Klass A for the season, before changing to simply the Soviet Second League. For 1990 and 1991 seasons this competition was moved further down the Soviet league levels into the newly formed Soviet Second League B also earlier known as the G group or simply the Third League.

Until World War II up to 11 clubs competed in the Soviet championship. Nine clubs from Ukraine participated in the first season of the Soviet competition: Dynamo Kyiv (I Division); Dynamo Dnipropetrovsk and Dynamo Kharkiv (II Division); Dynamo Odesa, Spartak Kharkiv, Ugolschiki Staline, Lokomotyv Kyiv (III Division); Traktor Plant Kharkiv, Stal Dnipropetrovsk (IV Division). Later other clubs has entered the competition: Silmash Kharkiv, Frunze Plant Kostiantynivka, Sudostroitel Mykolaiv, and Dzerzhynets Voroshylovhrad.

The Ukrainian club competition in the Second League had existed and prior to 1963, but was not such an exclusive and consistent part of the Soviet League system. In 1970 and 1990 there were few reformations. In 1970 the First League was reduced to a single group and, because of that, the Second League extended into upper and lower (B) divisions. The lower division was named as the Second League B and for the next season was liquidated. In 1990 a similar reform was taken upon the Second League. Its 10 regional groups were reduced to just three still by the regional principal while the league was renamed into the Buffer League (West, Center, and East). This reform also introduced what was planned to be a fourth level of professional competition allowing each republic to have its own professional league. That fourth level competition was named as the Second League, the former name of the Buffer League.

Republican competitions before 1936

Championship of cities

The first nationwide football competitions in Ukraine were established in 1921 as inter-cities competition of the Ukrainian SSR. The city teams consisted of different players from various teams of a particular city. Until 1930 the competition took place in Kharkiv, in 1931 it was conducted in Kyiv, and in 1932 – in Dnipropetrovsk and Zaporizhzhia.

In 1936 the competition was consolidated into the Soviet competitions with some of its teams qualified for the Soviet Top League. The championship itself became a republican level competition with its best team qualifying for the Soviet competitions.

Championship of the Proletarian Sports Society Dynamo
Parallel to the championship of cities there also existed separate tournament that was played among teams of Dynamo society (Proletarian Sports Society (PST) Dynamo) located throughout the Ukrainian SSR. The first tournament was conducted as part of the All-Ukrainian Dynamo Festival which was organized on the orders of the top OGPU official in Ukraine Vsevolod Balitsky. The tournament was also known as the Dynamiada of Ukraine. There existed some degree of confusion due to great number of tournament at that time.

Republican competitions after 1936

Football Championship among teams of sports societies (non-professional level)
The competitions were considered to be amateur. In Soviet Union officially all sports players were amateur athletes, however to differentiate level of teams, there were teams of sports societies and agencies (amateurs) and teams of masters (professionals).

Nonetheless in 1936 and in 1938 there were played games of one more tournament called the Season's Cup of the Ukrainian SSR to which qualified the cup holder and the champion. Those tournament were discontinued and there only were two games.

‡ – winners of the Football Cup of the Ukrainian SSR

Football Championship among teams of masters (professional level)
While many Ukrainian teams competed in the Class B before 1960, it was not until then when they were organized into own republican competition which was officially considered as the one among teams of masters (professional teams).

For 1990 and 1991 the Soviet Second League was again restructured and degraded farther into the fourth division of the competition yielding to the newly formed Buffer League. Buffer League (a.k.a. Second League) covered much bigger area for the competition, while the Second League (a.k.a. Lower Second League) was assigned specifically for most of the Soviet republics including Ukraine.

Soviet Class B (Ukraine)
Official name of the established competition was the Class B, UkrSSR. Originally reestablished soon after the World War II as the Second Group (1945-1949), the Class B football competitions succeeded it in 1950 as part of the Soviet second tier. As part of the Ukrainian championship, Class B existed in 1960-1970.

Note: until 1963 Class B was the second division of the Soviet football competition, analog of the First League with several zones formed by territorial principle. Since then it was degraded into the third and later renamed as the Soviet Second League.

Ukrainian competitions consisted of two zones until 1970, when it was restructured into two hierarchical leagues. After 1971 teams of the lower league lost their professional status (teams of masters).

Soviet second-tiered competitions

Soviet third-tiered competitions

Soviet fourth-tiered competitions

Soviet Class A, Second Group (Ukraine, Soviet third tier)

Second League (Soviet third tier)

Second League Lower (Soviet fourth tier)

List of all champions

Performance by club
The table does not include city teams that competed in the cities' championship.

Performance by city (Cities' championship)
The 1936 championship is not included.

Pre-World War II teams of masters (professional clubs) in Ukraine

 1936–1941 FC Dinamo Kyiv
 1936–1937 FC Dinamo Dnepropetrovsk
 1936–1940 FC Dynamo Kharkiv
 1936–1939 FC Dinamo Odesa
 1936–1941 FC Spartak Kharkiv
 1936–1941 FC Ugolshchiki Gorlovka → FC Stakhanovets Stalino (FC Shakhtar Donetsk) 
 1936–1940 FC Lokomotyv Kyiv
 1936–1937 FC KhTZ Kharkiv → FC Traktor Kharkiv (FC Torpedo Kharkiv)
 1936 FC Stal Dnepropetrovsk
 1936–1940 FC Serp i Molot Kharkiv (FC Silmash Kharkiv)
 1936–1937 FC Stal Konstantinovka

 1937 FC Lokomotiv Dnepropetrovsk
 1937–1940 FC Sudostroitel Nikolayev
 1937 FC Spartak Kyiv
 1937–1939 FC Stal Dnepropetrovsk (FC Dnipro)
 1939–1940 FC Dzerzhynets Voroshylovgrad (FC Zorya Luhansk)
 1940–1941 FC Pishchevik Odesa (FC Spartak Odesa)

Post war teams of masters (professional clubs) in Ukraine before Ukrainian Class B

 1945– FC Dynamo Kyiv
 1945– FC Shakhter Stalino
 1945–1955 FC Lokomotyv Kharkiv
 1945–1950 FC Pishchevik Odesa
 1946–1949, 1953– FC Stal Dnepropetrovsk → FC Metallurg Dnepropetrovsk
 1946–1949, 1957– FC Sudostroitel Nikolayev → FC Avangard Nikolayev
 1947–1949, 1952– ODO Kyiv
 1947–1949 FC Spartak Lvov
 1947–1949 FC Spartak Kherson
 1947–1949, 1951, 1954– FC Spartak Uzhgorod
 1947–1949 FC Metalist Kharkiv
 1947–1949 FC Dinamo Voroshylovgrad
 1947–1949 FC Bolshevik Zaporizhzhia → FC Lokomotiv Zaporizhzhia
 1948–1949 FC Avangard Kramatorsk
 1948–1949, 1957– FC Shakhter Kadeevka
 1948–1949 FC Bolshevik Mukachevo
 1949 FC Spartak Kyiv
 1949 FC Torpedo Kharkiv
 1949 FC Dinamo Chernovtsy
 1949, 1957– FC Trudovye Rezervy Voroshylovgrad
 1949, 1954– DO Lvov

 1953–1954 FC Metallurg Odesa
 1953– FC Metallurg Zaporizhzhia
 1955– FC Pishchevik Odesa → FC Chernomorets Odesa
 1956– FC Avangard Kharkiv
 1956– FC Spartak Stanislav
 1957– SC ChF Sevastopol
 1957– FC Kolgospnik Poltava
 1957– FC Khimik Dneprodzerzhynsk
 1958– SKVO Odesa
 1958– FC Avangard Simferopol → SC Tavriya Simferopol
 1958– FC Lokomotiv Vinnitsa
 1958– FC Kolgospnik Rovno
 1958– FC Lokomotiv Stalino
 1959– FC Kolgospnik Cherkassy
 1959– FC Arsenal Kyiv
 1959– FC Zirka Kirovograd
 1959– FC Avangard Zhytomir
 1959– Krivoi Rog team
 1959– FC Avangard Ternopol
 1959– FC Shakhter Gorlovka

Teams from other republics

Moldavian teams
 Speranța Drochia
 Avtomobilist Tiraspol (previously as Start, Luceafărul)
 FC Nistrul Bendery
 FC Stroitel Beltsy

Belarusian teams
 FC Neman Grodno
 FC Dvina Vitebsk

Russian teams
 FC Baltika Kaliningrad

See also
 Ukrainian Premier League
 Ukrainian First League
 Football Cup of the Ukrainian SSR
 List of Ukrainian football champions

Notes

References

External links
Ukrainian SSR championships
USSR football tables
Ukrainian Football History
All Ukrainian champions including Soviet at RSSSF
Ukrainian quarter. 1991, first champion (Український квотер. 1991, перший чемпіон).
Banyas, V. Movement of life, or – Dynamo! (Рух життя, або — «Динамо»!). Ukrainian Premier League. 14 September 2017
 Хто був першим чемпіоном України ?.

Ukraine
Soviet
1921 establishments in Ukraine
1991 disestablishments in Ukraine
Recurring sporting events established in 1921
Recurring events disestablished in 1991
 
Sport in the Ukrainian Soviet Socialist Republic
Uk
Uk